The 2009 Texas A&M–Commerce Lions football team represented Texas A&M University-Commerce in the 2009 NCAA Division II football season. They were led by head coach Guy Morriss, who was in his first season at A&M-Commerce. The Lions played their home games at Memorial Stadium and were members of the Lone Star Conference. The Lions finished as Lone Star Conference North Division Champions for the second time in 3 seasons.

Schedule

Postseason awards

All-Americans
William Green, First Team Defensive Line

All-Lone Star Conference

LSC superlatives
Coach of The Year: Guy Morriss
Defensive Lineman of the Year: William Greene
Linebacker of The Year: Cory Whitfield 
Offensive Lineman of the Year: R.J. Brisbon

LSC First Team
Ahmed Abo-Mahmood, Kicker
R.J. Brisbon, Offensive Line
Alex Contreras, Safety
Marcus Graham, Running Back
William Green, Defensive Line
Israel Hughes, Defensive Back
David Sudderth, Offensive Line
Cory Whitfield, Linebacker

LSC Honorable Mention
Stephen DeGrate, Linebacker
Adam Farkes, Quarterback
Reid Herchenbach, Tight End

References

Texas AandM-Commerce
Texas A&M–Commerce Lions football seasons
Texas AandM-Commerce Lions Football